The Nanguo Metropolis Daily, also known as South China Metropolis Daily or South China Metropolitan Daily, is a Haikou-based Chinese language daily newspaper published in Hainan Province, People's Republic of China. The newspaper is a sub-paper of Hainan Daily.

Nanguo Metropolis Daily was sponsored and is supervised by the Hainan Daily Newspaper Industry Group (海南日报报业集团). The newspaper is the first metropolis newspaper in Hainan.

Nanguo Metropolis Daily was launched on January 1, 2001, according to a poll by Central China Television (CCTV), the paper has the largest share of the newspaper market in Hainan. In 2009 the Nanguo News was rated in the top ten most innovative metropolitan newspapers in China.

See also
 Hainan Daily, Hainan's the other major daily newspaper

References

External links
 Nanguo Metropolis Daily Online (Simplified Chinese)

Daily newspapers published in China
Mass media in Haikou
Chinese-language newspapers (Simplified Chinese)
Publications established in 2001
Organizations based in Haikou
2001 establishments in China